Bad Tennstedt is a town in the Unstrut-Hainich-Kreis district, in Thuringia, Germany. It is situated 27 km east of Mühlhausen, and 24 km northwest of Erfurt.

The Romantic poet Novalis worked here from 1794 until 1796. During his stay he met Sophie von Kühn, his later fiancée.

Personality

Natives 
 Christoph Schmidt (1629-1676), merchant and alderman, grandfather of Friedrich Gottlieb Klopstock
 Johann August Ernesti (1707-1781), educator, scholar and theologian

People associated with Tennstedt 

 Johann Wolfgang von Goethe (1749-1832), stayed for curative treatments in 1816 Tennstedt, of this now reminds the Goethe House
 Friedrich von Hardenberg (pseudonym Novalis, 1772-1801), was from 1794 to 1796 employed in Tennstedt in Saxon Management Service
 Warren William (1894-1948), American film star of the 1930s with ancestors from Tennstedt

References

Unstrut-Hainich-Kreis
Spa towns in Germany